Errigal civil parish is located in County Londonderry, Northern Ireland.

Townlands
The parish comprises the following townlands in County Londonderry

Altduff
Ballintemple
 Ballyrogan
 Belraugh
Boleran
Brockagh
 Brockaghboy
Cah
 Coolcoscreaghan
 Coolnasillagh
 Crockindollagh
Drumbane
 Dunnavenny
Farrantemple Glebe
 Freugh
Garvagh
Glenkeen
 Gortfad
 Gortnamoyagh
Inshaleen
Liscall
 Lisnascreghog
Mettican Glebe
Slaghtaverty
Tamnymore
 Tibaran

See also
List of civil parishes of County Londonderry
List of townlands in County Londonderry

References

Civil parishes of County Londonderry